Worthing Pier is a public pleasure pier in Worthing, West Sussex, England. Designed by Sir Robert Rawlinson, it was opened on 12 April 1862 and remains open to the public. It is a Grade II listed building structure.
The pier has been named Pier of the Year by the National Piers Society on two occasions, first in 2006 and again in 2019.

History
By 1894 a steam ship began operation between Worthing Pier and the Chain Pier in Brighton, twelve miles to the east. Over the Easter weekend that year 4 year old Archie Miles, separated from his promenading family, managed to unwittingly stow away on board setting off a police hunt and was only reunited with his frantic parents after a night in the workhouse at Brighton and a telegram to his grandparents in Mayfield.

The first moving picture show in Worthing was seen on the pier on 31 August 1896 and is commemorated today by a blue plaque.

In March 1913, on Easter Monday, the pier was damaged in a storm, with only the southern end remaining, completely cut off from land. Later, it was affectionately named 'Easter Island'. A rebuilt pier was opened on 29 May 1914.

In September 1933 the pier and all but the northern pavilion were destroyed by fire. In 1935 the remodelled Streamline Moderne pier was opened, and it is this that remains today.

Worthing Pier was sectioned in 1940 for fear of German invasion after the British retreat at Dunkirk.  Army engineers used explosive to blow a 120ft. hole by in the pier to prevent it from being used as a possible landing stage in the event of an invasion.

The pier is owned by Worthing Borough Council (formerly Worthing Corporation).

The Pavilion Theatre and Denton Cafe is situated at the northern, land end of the pier; at the middle is the 1935 amusement arcade, which from 1956 - 2006 carried a distinctive 'New Amusements' sign that was featured on the cover of the album To See the Lights (1996) by Britpop band Gene. Since 2006 the sign has changed from 'New Amusements' to 'Pier Amusements'.

The Southern Pavilion (the sea end) is currently home to tearoom and function area, having undergone extensive renovation between September 2013 and the re-opening in April 2014, having previously been used as a nightclub named The Pier, which opened on 20 December 2007, and prior to that a cafe, dance hall and to house a model railway layout. It can be hired for weddings and is used as a live music venue.

However, Birdman competitions were held in both towns from 2010. On 24 February 2016, it was announced that the Birdman will be cancelled for that year and that the Worthing Town Centre Initiative (WTCI) were unsure whether it would return in 2017.

In November 2009 during strong winds, two Worthing kite surfers became the first people to kitesurf over the pier.

Awards received
2006 - National Piers Society - Pier of the Year

2019 - National Piers Society - Pier of the Year

References

External links
History of Worthing Pier
"Worthing of which Goring-by-Sea is a part"

Piers in Sussex
Pier fires
Buildings and structures in Worthing
Grade II listed buildings in West Sussex
Streamline Moderne architecture in the United Kingdom
Tourist attractions in West Sussex
Art Deco architecture in England
Burned buildings and structures in the United Kingdom